Rademacher is an occupational surname of German origin, which means "wheelmaker". It may refer to:

People
Arthur Rademacher (1889–1981), Australian football player
Autumn Rademacher (born 1975), American basketball coach
Bill Rademacher (born 1942), American football player 
Debbie Rademacher (born 1966), American soccer player
Erich Rademacher (1901–1979), German swimmer
Franz Rademacher (1906–1973), German diplomat
Hans Rademacher (1892–1969), German-born American mathematician
Ingo Rademacher (born 1971), Australian actor
Isaac Rademacher (born 1977), American soldier
Joachim Rademacher (1906–1970), German water polo player
Joseph Rademacher (bishop) (1840–1900), American bishop
Joseph Rademacher (soldier) (born 1985), American soldier
Mark Rademacher (1963–1983), American soldier
Pete Rademacher (1928-2020), American boxer
Rudolf Rademacher (1913–1953), German pilot

Other uses
House of Rademacher, German noble family
Rademacher (band)
Rademacher complexity, a statistical measure
Rademacher distribution, a probability distribution in statistics
Rademacher system, a statistical system of functions
Rademacher's theorem, a statistical theorem in measure theory

See also
Radermacher
Rademaker

German-language surnames
Occupational surnames